Roldiah Matulessy (born August 11, 1925), often known by her nickname Roldiah, was an Indonesian actress and singer who is known as the oldest winner of Citra Award on Indonesian Film Festival in 1987 from her role in Nagabonar.

Biography 
Roldiah Matulessy was born on August 11, 1925 at Yogyakarta, Special Region of Yogyakarta, Dutch East Indies. She completed junior school education.

She started her career at the age of 12 by partaking a minor role in Terang Boelan (1937). After the film was successful, Matulessy took a nine year hiatus from film and began her career as a singer and stage actress.

Filmography 
During her fifty-four year career Matulessy acted in some thirty-five films.

 Terang Boelan (1937)
 Kali Brantas (1954)
 Takdir (1973)
 Dimana Kau Ibu (1973)
 Perkawinan Dalam Semusim (1976)
 Tanah Harapan (1976)
 Donat Pahlawan Pandir (1977)
 Jangan Menangis Mama (1977)
 Buah Terlarang (1979)
 Romantika Remaja (1979)
 Gadis Penakluk (1980)
 Tempatmu Di Sisiku (1980)
 Bawalah Aku Pergi (1981)
 Bunga Cinta Kasih (1981)
 Maju Kena Mundur Kena (1983)
 Saat-Saat Yang Indah (1984)
 Naga Bonar (1986)
 Ayahku (1987)
 Omong Besar (1988)
 Tragedi Bintaro (1989)
 Takkan Lari Jodoh Dikejar (1990)

Awards 

During her career Matulessy was nominated for two Citra Awards. Her first nomination, in 1982, was for the film Bawalah Aku Pergi; she received a nomination for the Citra Award for Best Supporting Actress. In 1987 she won the Citra Award for Best Supporting Actress, for the films Nagabonar, which then makes her as the oldest actress to receive a Citra Award on Indonesian Film Festival.

References

External links 

1925 births
Possibly living people
People from Yogyakarta
Citra Award winners
Indonesian film actresses
Actresses of the Dutch East Indies
20th-century Indonesian actresses
Indonesian stage actresses